Hoseynabad-e Ab Shur (also Romanized as Ḩoseynābād-e Āb Shūr and Hosein Abad Abshoor; also known as Ḩassanābād-e Āb Shūr) is a village in Gonbaki Rural District, Gonbaki District, Rigan County, Kerman Province, Iran. At the 2006 census, its population was 528, in 78 families.

References 

Populated places in Rigan County